Carmen M. Tun (April 14, 1939 – December 8, 2016), also known as Carmen Mutnguy, was a teacher, Yapese historian, linguist, and grassroots advocate from Yap, Micronesia. She is the wife of the first Vice President of the Federated States of Micronesia, Petrus Tun. She was also First Lady to the second Governor of Yap from 1987–1995.

Career
In the early 1960s, Carmen Mutnguy was a teacher, and an officer of the Yap Women's Association (YWA) which she co-founded with members of the women of Yap. She also served as Post Master of the Yap branch of the FSM Postal Service, and retired on April 6, 2000.

Books
In 1960, Carmen M. Tun, put down the Legend of Manbuth, a local Yapese tale. She was instrumental in the translation of the Bible to the Yapese language.

References

biography
Manbuth by Carmen Mutnguy

1939 births
2016 deaths